Mike Voyle (born , Caerphilly, Wales), is a former Wales international rugby union player. A lock forward, he played club rugby for Newbridge RFC, Ebbw Vale RFC, Llanelli RFC, Newport RFC, Cardiff RFC and Newport Gwent Dragons.
  
Voyle attained 22 caps for Wales and he was selected for the Wales squad for the 1999 Rugby World Cup.

References

He Now lives in Kapiti Coast, New Zealand,With 2 kids and works in Real Estate. He helps coaching with Rugby teams from Kapiti College.

1970 births
Living people
Cardiff RFC players
Dragons RFC players
Llanelli RFC players
Newport RFC players
Rugby union players from Caerphilly
Wales international rugby union players
Welsh rugby union players
Rugby union locks